Acacia anastema, commonly known as sandridge gidgee or just gidgee, is a tree in the family Fabaceae.  Endemic to Western Australia, it occurs within a fairly small area of semi-arid land east of Carnarvon.

Sandridge Gidgee grows as an upright tree to seven metres high.  Like most Acacia species, it has phyllodes rather than true leaves.  These may be up to twenty centimetres long and five centimetres wide.  The flowers are yellow, and held in cylindrical clusters between two and four centimetres long. The pods are slightly curved, up to 14 centimetres long and two to three centimetres wide.

Sandridge gidgee has limited utility.  Its long straight limbs are resistant to termites, and so are locally used for fence posts.  The tree provides no forage to animals as its canopy is typically out of reach of stock.

See also
List of Acacia species

References

 
 
 

Fabales of Australia
Acacias of Western Australia
anastema
Taxa named by Bruce Maslin